A Nissen hut is a prefabricated steel structure for military use, especially as barracks, made from a half-cylindrical skin of corrugated iron. Designed during the First World War by the American-born, Canadian-British engineer and inventor Major Peter Norman Nissen, it was used also extensively during the Second World War, being adapted as the similar Quonset hut in the United States.

Description

A Nissen hut is made from a sheet of metal bent into half a cylinder and planted in the ground with its axis horizontal. The cross-section is not precisely semi-circular, because the bottom of the hut curves out slightly. The exterior is formed from curved corrugated steel sheets 10 feet 6 inches by 2 feet 2 inches (3.2 × 0.7 m), laid with a two-corrugation lap at the side and a 6-inch (15 cm) overlap at the ends. Three sheets cover the arc of the hut. They are attached to five 3 × 2 inch (7.5 × 5 cm) wooden purlins and 3 × 2 inch wooden spiking plates at the ends of the floor joists.

The purlins are attached to eight T-shaped ribs (1¾ × 1¾ × ⅛ inch; 4.5 × 4.5 × 0.5 cm) set at 6 feet 0.5 inch (1.8 m) centres. Each rib consists of three sections bolted together using splice plates, and each end is bolted to the floor at the bearers. With each rib are two straining wires, one on each side, and a straining ratchet (or in some cases a simple fencing wire strainer). The wires are strained during construction. The straining wires do not appear in the original Nissen patent.

The purlins are attached to the ribs using a "hook" bolt, which hooks through a pre-drilled hole in the rib and is secured into the purlin. The hook bolt is a unique feature of the Nissen design.

Interior lining could be horizontal corrugated iron or material like hardboard attached to the ribs. Sometimes corrugated asbestos cement sheeting was used. If required, the space between the lining and the exterior may be used for insulation and services.

The walls and floors rest on foundations consisting of 4 × 4 inch (10 × 10 cm) stumps with 15 × 9 inch (38 × 23 cm) sole plates. On these are 4 × 3 inch (10 × 8 cm) bearers and 4 × 2 inch (10 × 5 cm) joists at 2 feet 10 inch (86 cm) centres. The floor is made from tongue and groove floorboards.

At each end the walls are made from a wooden frame with weatherboards nailed to the outside.

Windows and doors may be added to the sides by creating a dormer form by adding a frame to take the upper piece of corrugated iron and replacing the lower piece with a suitable frame for a door or window.

Nissen huts come in three internal spans (diameters)—16 ft (4.9 m), 24 ft (7.3 m) or 30 ft (9.2 m). The longitudinal bays come in multiples of 6 ft (1.8 m), allowing the length of the cylinder to be any multiple of 6 ft.

The corrugated steel half-circles used to build Nissen huts can be stored efficiently because the curved sheets can be cupped one inside another. However, there is no standard model of Nissen hut, because the design was never static and changed according to demand.

History
Between  16 and 18 April 1916, Major Peter Norman Nissen of the 29th Company Royal Engineers of the British Army began to experiment with hut designs. Nissen, a mining engineer and inventor, constructed three prototype semi-cylindrical huts. The semi-cylindrical shape was derived from the drill-shed roof at Queen's University, Kingston, Ontario (collapsed 1896). Nissen's design was subject to intensive review by his fellow officers, Lieutenant Colonels Shelly, Sewell and McDonald, and General Clive Gerard Liddell, which helped Nissen develop the design. After the third prototype was completed, the design was formalized and the Nissen hut was put into production in August 1916. At least 100,000 were produced in the First World War.

Nissen patented his invention in the UK in 1916 and patents were taken out later in the United States, Canada, South Africa and Australia. Nissen received royalties from the British government, not for huts made during the war, but only for their sale after the conflict. Nissen received some £13,000 and was awarded the DSO (Distinguished Service Order).

Two factors influenced the design of the hut. First, the building had to be economical in its use of materials, especially considering wartime shortages of building material. Second, the building had to be portable. This was particularly important in view of the wartime shortages of shipping space. This led to a simple form that was prefabricated for ease of erection and removal. The Nissen hut could be packed in a standard Army wagon and erected by six men in four hours. The world record for erection is 1 hour 27 minutes.

Production of Nissen huts waned between the wars, but was revived in 1939. Nissen Buildings Ltd. waived its patent rights for wartime production during the Second World War (1939–45). Similar-shaped hut types were developed as well, notably the larger Romney hut in the UK and the Quonset hut in the United States. All types were mass-produced in the thousands. The Nissen hut was used for a wide range of functions; apart from accommodation, they functioned as churches and bomb stores among other uses.
Accounts of life in the hut generally were not positive. Huts in the United Kingdom were frequently seen as cold and draughty, while those in the Middle East, Asia and the Pacific were seen as stuffy and humid.

Use as family housing 

Although the prefabricated hut was conceived to meet wartime demand for accommodation, similar situations, such as construction camps, are places where prefabricated buildings are useful. The Nissen hut was adapted into a larger prefabricated two-storey house and marketed by Nissen-Petren Ltd. Four of the original prototypes survive in Queen Camel in Somerset.  The standard Nissen hut was often recycled into housing. A similar approach was taken with the U.S. Quonset hut at the end of the war, with articles on how to adapt the buildings for domestic use appearing in Home Beautiful and Popular Mechanics.

In Aultbea on Loch Ewe, in Scotland, a large Nissen hut cinema built by the Royal Navy was donated to the village after WW2, and remains in use as a community hall.  Nissen hut houses survive in Hvalfjörður, Iceland. They were built to house naval personnel during  the Second World War. 

However, the adaptation of the semi-cylindrical hut to non-institutional uses was not popular. Neither the Nissen nor the Quonset developed into popular housing, despite their low cost. One reason was the association with huts: a hut was not a house, with all the status a house implies. The second point was that rectangular furniture does not fit into a curved-wall house very well, and, thus, the actual usable space in a hut might be much less than supposed.

In the UK, after the Second World War many were converted for agricultural or industrial purposes, and numerous examples have since been demolished.

Use in Australia

In Australia, after the war, Nissen huts were erected at many migrant camps around the country.

Most post-Second World War Nissen huts were used by governments. However, there is one  block that was built as private housing. Fifty Nissen huts were constructed in Belmont North, a suburb of Newcastle, New South Wales, Australia. They were designed to provide cheap, ready-made housing for post-war British migrant families. Seventeen of the huts have been demolished over the years, but the remainder have been refurbished, improved and extended and remain popular with their owners. However attempts to have the remaining huts heritage listed in 2009 failed in the face of opposition from some owners.

The story of Western Australia's post-War migrants has been marked with the state heritage-listing of the remaining parts of the former Main Roads Migrant Camp in Narrogin, Western Australia. The camp housed European migrants who had been displaced by the war and resettled in Western Australia, then employed in road construction. The Australian Government worked with the United Nations to accept, resettle and provide employment for many thousands of Europeans after the Second World War.

Main Roads was one of three migrant camps set up in Narrogin in the late 1940s and used until the mid-1950s. The camp's conditions were basic, with migrants living in tents and Nissen huts. The three Nissen huts are the only ones to survive. Post-war migrants played a vital role in the development of the state through the construction of state and local government buildings, roads and railways. Today, the place is used by Main Roads Western Australia as its Wheatbelt South Region Headquarters.

Gallery

See also
 B hut
 Dymaxion deployment unit
 Earthquake engineering
 Iris hut
 Italian Chapel, constructed from two Nissen huts by Italian prisoners of war on Lamb Holm, Orkney Islands
 Quonset hut
 Romney hut
 Rubb hall
 Tin tabernacle, prefabricated churches made from corrugated galvanised steel
 Patera Building

Notes

Citations

Bibliography
 Engineer in Chief (Army). 1966. Handbook of Nissen Huts: 16′0″ and 24′0″ Span, issued December 1944, Revised March 1966 Army Code No 14867. (Probably a British Army publication.)
 Francis, P. 1996. British Military Airfield Architecture: from Airships to the Jet Age. Yeovil: Patrick Stephens Limited.
 Innes, G. B. 1995. British Airfield Buildings of the Second World War. Earl Shinton: Midland Publishing Limited
 Innes, G. B. 2000. British Airfield Buildings Volume 2: The Expansion & Inter-War Periods. Hersham: Midland Publishing.
 McCosh, F. 1997 Nissen of the Huts: A biography of Lt Col. Peter Nissen, DSO. Bourne End: B D Publishing.
 Pullar, M. 1997. Prefabricated WWII Structures in Queensland. Report to National Trust of Queensland.
 Stuart, I. M. 2005. "Of the Hut, I bolted: A preliminary account of prefabricated semi-cylindrical huts in Australia". Historic Environment, Vol. 19 (1):51–56.
 John Huxley, "History goes full semi-circle to save Nissen Town", Sydney Morning Herald, 14 March 2009

External links

Barracks
Huts
Iron and steel buildings
Military equipment of the United Kingdom
Prefabricated houses
United Kingdom in World War I
United Kingdom in World War II
World War I military equipment of the United Kingdom